Oscar Adrián Alegre (born 6 April 1983) was an Argentine footballer.

He played for Ñublense.

References
 Profile at BDFA 
 

1983 births
Living people
Argentine expatriate footballers
Argentine footballers
Argentinos Juniors footballers
Juventud Antoniana footballers
Ñublense footballers
Primera B de Chile players
Argentine Primera División players
Expatriate footballers in Chile
Expatriate footballers in Indonesia
Association football forwards
Sportspeople from Salta Province